The Eastern Orthodox Church in Moldova is organized by the Metropolis of Chișinău and All Moldova, commonly referred to as the Moldovan Orthodox Church, a self-governing church body under the Russian Orthodox Church, and by the Metropolis of Bessarabia, also referred to as the Bessarabian Orthodox Church, a self-governing church body under the Romanian Orthodox Church. According to a 2011 Gallup survey on religion, among the Eastern Orthodox of Moldova, 86% belonged to the Moldovan Orthodox Church, while 13% belonged to the Bessarabian Orthodox Church. Other Orthodox jurisdictions - non canonical ones included - have few other parishes in the region.

History

Middle Ages

The first attested Christian organization the territory of the later Principality of Moldavia was the Catholic Diocese of Cumania in the southern part of the region, dating from 1227, at a time when the Kingdom of Hungary attempted to extend its control in the region. However, as early as 1234, Orthodox Moldovans are mentioned in the diocese, having their own "pseudobishops" (or rural bishops). The diocese was soon destroyed by the Mongol invasion of 1241, and only beginning with the late 13th century did Catholic missionaries become active again in southern Moldavia.

In the early stages of its statehood (14th century), Moldavia was under the authority of the Orthodox bishop of Halych. Around 1371, during the reign of Lațcu, the court passed to Catholicism and a Catholic diocese was founded at Siret. The conversion was reverted soon after, with voivode Roman I of Moldavia installing a local cleric as bishop. By 1391 a new Orthodox metropolitan, Joseph of Belgorod, had been ordained by the archbishop of Halych. The move was opposed by the Patriarchate of Constantinople, who in 1391 named Theodosius as Metropolitan bishop of Moldavia. Around 1392, the same position was given by the Patriarch to Jeremiah. The Moldovan rulers refused to accept either and banished the latter from Moldavia, action resulting in an anathema against Moldavia issued by the Patriarch of Constantinople. A further two patriarchal missions were sent to Moldavia in 1395 and 1397 in a bid to regain authority over the local church. As the Mitropolitan see remained canonically vacant in 1394, the Moldavian priest Peter was named exarch over Moldavia by Constantinople, a move that probably was not accepted by the local rulers either.

In 1401 the voivode Alexandru cel Bun obtained from the Patriarchate of Constantinople the recognition of Joseph, whose anathema had been raised on the occasion, as head of an autonomous Metropolitan Moldavian See at Suceava, with 3 bishoprics and jurisdiction over the entire territory of the Principality of Moldavia. The Catholics were also favoured by Alexandru and in 1417 a new Roman Catholic bishop was ordained at Baia, with authority mainly over Hungarian and German merchants in that market town. Moldavia also sent delegates to the Catholic Council of Constance in 1421. All these caused problems for the Metropolitan bishop, who was called to Constantinople in 1415 but had to wait until 1471, when the new patriarch was enthroned, to have his position reconfirmed. Moldavia's extensive diplomatic relations with the Pope did not contribute to good relations between the Moldavian church ad its direct superior, the Patriarch of Constantinople. Towards 1436, the Pope named a Moldavian, Gregory, as Archbishop of Moldavia, however he was never recognized by the rulers of the country, and disappeared from history. Moldavian delegates were also present at the Council of Florence, where Damian, the Moldavian Orthodox metropolitan, signed the Union of the Western and Eastern Churches.

From the 15th century the Patriarchate of Constantinople was forced to content itself with subordination to the Ottoman Sultanate, the Metropolitan of Moldavia being ordained since by the Archbishop of Ohrid.

Modern times
The 17th century saw the adoption of the national language in the church (when many religious texts were translated in Romanian, especially during the time of Metropolitan Dosoftei), which replaced Old Slavonic language. In 1677, the seat of the Metropolis of Moldavia was permanently moved to Iași.

19th century
Bessarabia, the eastern half of the Principality of Moldavia, was annexed by the Russian Empire in 1812, including the territory constituting the Chişinău Eparchy, which was reorganized and placed under the Russian Orthodox Church. Its first Metropolitan was Gavril Bănulescu-Bodoni, a popular promoter of the Romanian language and culture. Its last metropolitan was Anastasios, the future first-hierarch of the Russian Orthodox Church Abroad.

20th century
In January 1918 Bessarabia proclaimed independence as Moldavian Democratic Republic and in April 1918 it united with Romania. The territory of modern-day Republic of Moldova was then made a part of the Metropolitanate of Bessarabia, under the Romanian Orthodox Church.

After World War II, Bessarabia was occupied by the USSR, which was hostile to the church. The body of the church was downgraded to a "Bishopric of Chişinău and Moldova" under the Russian Orthodox Church.

After 1991, the Bishop of Bălți, Petru, led a movement that re-instated the former Metropolitan See of Bessarabia, reviving the one existing in the interwar period, and placing it under the authority of the Romanian Orthodox Church, but retaining a larger degree of autonomy than the other Metropolitanates of the Romanian Orthodox Church.

In October 1992, the Bishopric of Chișinău was elevated to Metropolitan Church of Chișinău and all Moldova and granted autonomy by the Russian Orthodox Church. Later the state re-registered the churches and refused to register the Metropolitanate of Bassarabia, which led to a lengthy court action that lasted until the European Court of Human Rights ordered the Moldovan state to register it, in 2004. An uneasy peace exists nowadays between the two Churches. The majority of the population remains under the Metropolitan Church of Chișinău and all Moldova, while ca. 20% are under the Metropolitan See of Bessarabia.

See also
History of Christianity in Romania
Religion in Moldova

References